Heinrich Otto Abetz (26 March 1903 – 5 May 1958) was the German ambassador to Vichy France during the Second World War and a convicted war criminal. In July 1949 he was sentenced to twenty years' hard labour by a Paris military tribunal, he was released in April 1954 and died in a car accident four years later.

Early years
Abetz was born in Schwetzingen on 26 March 1903. He was the son of an estate manager, who died when Otto was only 13. Abetz matriculated in Karlsruhe, where he became an art teacher at a girls' school.

He would eventually join the Hitler Youth where he became a close friend of Joachim von Ribbentrop. He was also one of the founders of the Reichsbanner, the paramilitary arm of the Social Democrats, and was associated with groups such as the Black Front, a group of dissident National Socialists associated with Otto Strasser.

Abetz cultivated a legacy of strengthening Franco-German relations. Interested in French culture at an early age, in his twenties he started a Franco-German cultural group for youths, along with Jean Luchaire, known as the Sohlberg Congress. The group brought together a hundred German and French youth of all professions, social classes, political leanings, and religious affiliation. The group held their first conference in the Black Forest, and were frequently convened around ski slopes, campfires, and in hostels. The group maintained relations with the media through Luchaire's connection to the Notre Temps, and Abetz started the Sohlberg Circle (Sohlbergkreis). In 1934 the Sohlberg Circle was reborn as the Franco-German Committee (Comité France-Allemagne), which included Pierre Drieu la Rochelle and Jacques Benoist-Mechin.

An ardent Francophile, Abetz married Luchaire's French secretary, Susanne de Bruyker, in 1932. His politics were leftist, and he was known as a pacifist who bridged differences with fascists.

National Socialist period
Abetz "pledged his support" for the NSDAP in 1931 and formally joined in 1937, the year he applied for the German Foreign Service. From 1938, he was representing Germany in Paris. There, he joined masonic lodge Goethe in 1939.

Abetz attended the Munich Conference in 1938. He was expelled from France in June 1939 following allegations he had bribed two French newspaper editors to write pro-German articles; his expulsion created a scandal in France when it emerged that the wife of the French Foreign Minister Georges Bonnet was a close friend of the two editors, which led to much lurid speculation in the French press that Bonnet had received bribes from Abetz, though no firm evidence has ever emerged to support the rumors.

He was present in Adolf Hitler's entourage at the fall of Warsaw, and served as a translator for the German Führer. He returned to France in June 1940 following the German occupation and was assigned by Joachim von Ribbentrop to the embassy in Paris.

Following Hitler's June 30 directive, Abetz was assigned by Ribbentrop the project of "safeguarding" all objects of art, public, private, and especially Jewish-owned. Abetz embarked on the job with enthusiasm and announced to the Wehrmacht that the embassy had been "charged with the seizure of French works of art... and with the listing and seizure of works owned by Jews." On 17 September 1940 Hitler allowed Einsatzstab Rosenberg into the game too and soon pushed Abetz out of the confiscation business. The Pétain government protested Abetz's undertakings in late October, but nothing could stop the German agencies. By the end of October so much material had accumulated at the Louvre that it was decided more space was needed.

Ambassador to Vichy France
In November 1940 Abetz was appointed to the German Embassy in Paris, in occupied France, at the age of 37 – a post he held until July 1944. He was also head of the French fifth columnists through Ribbentrop's special unit within the Foreign Service.

He advised the German military administration in Paris and was responsible for dealings with the French Government now based at Vichy.  In May 1941, he negotiated the Paris Protocols to expand German access to French military facilities.

Otto Abetz was one of the few German functionaries who admired and respected von Ribbentrop. His primary objective was to secure complete collaboration from the French, through negotiations with Laval and Admiral Darlan. Abetz's function eventually evolved into becoming the catalyst for society, the arts, industry, education, and above all, propaganda. He assembled a team of journalists and academics. In addition to running the German embassy in Paris, Abetz acquired the Château de Chantilly in the countryside. He often entertained guests in both these places, living and working like a self-styled autocrat. One of the guests, the French writer Louis-Ferdinand Céline, jokingly referred to him as "King Otto I", and France as "the Kingdom of Otto".

The Embassy was theoretically responsible for all political questions in occupied France, which included SD operations, and for advising the German police and military. Abetz advised the military, the Gestapo and the SD, who nevertheless did not heed his advice. As the official representative of the German Government with the honorary rank of SS-Standartenführer (Colonel), he sought to seize the initiative as much as possible. In 1940 he created the German Institute, to be headed by Karl Epting, which was intended to improve French-German relations by offering a taste of German culture to the French people. Thirty thousand people signed up for the Institute's German language courses, but far more popular were the concerts which featured Germany's best musicians, including Herbert von Karajan and the Berlin Philharmonic Orchestra.

Following the occupation of all France on 11 November 1942, von Ribbentrop's influence became minimal as all of France was run by German military authorities, in conjunction with military police. A NSDAP Reichskommissariat of Belgien-Nordfrankreich held sway in several northern departments. Abetz was helpless to aid von Ribbentrop in Paris and von Ribbentrop recalled him in November following the occupation of all France. Abetz felt that he was in disfavour, although he did not understand why. He saw neither Hitler nor von Ribbentrop for a full year. He was consulted only once, on the formation of the French volunteer Waffen-SS unit Charlemagne. In his memoirs, Abetz assumed that he was considered "too francophile" and that his constant warnings about the loss of the French fleet and the loss of the French North Africa colonies were a thorn in the side of von Ribbentrop, particularly once they turned out to be correct. The scuttling of the French fleet in Toulon on 27 November had ensured that the French would not join the Axis.

He left France in September 1944 as the German armies withdrew, this despite claiming to Swedish ambassador Raoul Nordling on the seventh of the previous month that the Germans had neither killed political prisoners nor were making any plans to leave Paris.

Trial, conviction and death
Abetz was arrested by Allied authorities in the Schwarzwald in October 1945. In the announcement of his arrest in France Soir, he was quoted as saying that Adolf Hitler was not dead, but had escaped to Argentina. A French court sentenced Abetz to 20 years' imprisonment for crimes against humanity, particularly his role in arranging the deportation of French Jews from Drancy internment camp to the extermination camps. He was released from Loos prison on 17 April 1954.

He died on 5 May 1958, on the Cologne-Ruhr autobahn, burned to death in an accident, when something went wrong with his speeding car near Langenfeld. His death may have been a revenge killing for his role in the Holocaust.

Relatives
A great-nephew, Eric Abetz, is an Australian conservative and a Liberal Party former member of the Australian Senate, and was at one time a cabinet minister in the government of Tony Abbott. One of Eric's brothers, another great-nephew, the Reverend Peter Abetz, was a member of the Western Australian Legislative Assembly, also representing the Liberal Party. Eric Abetz has publicly distanced himself from his Nazi relative.

See also
 List SS-Brigadeführer

References

Sources

Further reading 
 
 
 Martin Mauthner (2016). Otto Abetz and His Paris Acolytes: French Writers Who Flirted with Fascism, 1930–1945. UK: Sussex Academic Press.

External links
 

1903 births
1958 deaths
Ambassadors of Germany to France
Nazi Party politicians
People of Vichy France
SS-Brigadeführer
Holocaust perpetrators in France
German people convicted of crimes against humanity
Road incident deaths in Germany